Jacqueline Baker is a Canadian writer. Originally from the Sand Hills region of southwestern Saskatchewan, she studied creative writing at the University of Victoria and the University of Alberta.

Her debut short story collection, A Hard Witching, was published in 2003. It was shortlisted for that year's Writers' Trust Fiction Prize, and won the Danuta Gleed Literary Award and the Alberta Book Award for short fiction.

Her first novel, The Horseman's Graves, was published in 2007. Her most recent novel is The Broken Hours, a ghost story about the final days of H. P. Lovecraft's life, in 2014.

She teaches creative writing at MacEwan University in Edmonton, Alberta.

External links
 Baker at MacEwan University

References

21st-century Canadian novelists
21st-century Canadian short story writers
21st-century Canadian women writers
Canadian women novelists
Canadian women short story writers
Canadian horror writers
Living people
Academic staff of MacEwan University
University of Victoria alumni
University of Alberta alumni
Women horror writers
Writers from Saskatchewan
Year of birth missing (living people)